Sidney Frederick Gueran (2 October 1916 – 18 September 1944) was an English footballer who made three first-team appearances for Southampton in 1937. His career was cut short when he was killed while serving with the British Army at the Battle of Arnhem, part of Operation Market Garden, in September 1944.

Football career
Gueran was born in Grays, Essex, before moving to Ramsgate as a child where he represented Ramsgate Schools. He joined Arsenal as an 18-year-old in May 1935 and was "farmed out" to play for Margate, Arsenal's nursery side.

Southampton's manager, Tom Parker (formerly an Arsenal player), used his connections to sign Gueran on loan in March 1936. Described as "a thoughtful and constructive inside-forward", Gueran spent most of his "Saints" career in the reserves, but was given a run-out in the first team in the last match of the 1936–37 season, when he replaced Wilf Mayer in a 3–0 defeat at home to Nottingham Forest.

Gueran made two further appearances in the opening matches of the next season, both defeats, before Arthur Holt took over at inside-right. Gueran then returned to reserve-team football, before being recalled by Arsenal in May 1938. A few weeks later, he was transferred permanently to Exeter City of the Third Division South, but failed to break into the first-team and "retired" from professional football later that year.

Later career and death
On the outbreak of World War II, Gueran enlisted in the Royal Engineers as a sapper attached to the 1st Parachute Squadron. He took part in the North African Campaign and the Italian campaign, and was killed on the second day of the Battle of Arnhem near the Arnhem road bridge while inside the Van Limburg Stirum School. An account of his death was presented in the book Arnhem 1944: The Human Tragedy of the Bridge Too Far, told by Gueran's platoon leader, Lance-Sergeant Harold Padfield.

He is commemorated on the Groesbeek Memorial in the Groesbeek Canadian War Cemetery.

Note
In all three of his first-team appearances for Southampton, Gueran played in front of defender Charlie Sillett, who was also killed on active service, in a U-boat attack on an allied convoy while serving with the Royal Navy in 1945.

See also
List of footballers killed during World War II

References

1916 births
1944 deaths
People from Grays, Essex
English footballers
Association football forwards
Margate F.C. players
Arsenal F.C. players
Southampton F.C. players
Exeter City F.C. players
English Football League players
Royal Engineers soldiers
British Army personnel killed in World War II
Military personnel from Essex